Susan Margaret Rodrigues (born 1987) is a Guyanese Politician, serving as Minister within the Ministry of House and Water. She was appointed to the position by President Mohamed Irfaan Ali, on 6 August 2020.

References 

Living people
People's Progressive Party (Guyana) politicians
Government ministers of Guyana
Women government ministers of Guyana
Members of the National Assembly (Guyana)
1987 births